Roland Peter Pöntinen (born 1963 in Stockholm, Sweden) is  a Swedish pianist and composer.

He is the son of a Finnish-speaking father, a native of the Russian district of Ingria (near Leningrad) who emigrated from the Soviet Union to Sweden in 1945.

He made his debut in 1981 with the Royal Stockholm Philharmonic Orchestra and has since then performed with major orchestras in Europe, USA, Korea, South-America, Australia and New Zealand. He has worked with conductors Myung-Whun Chung, Rafael Frühbeck de Burgos, Neeme Järvi, Paavo Järvi, Esa-Pekka Salonen, Jukka-Pekka Saraste, Leif Segerstam, Evgeny Svetlanov, Franz Welser-Möst and David Zinman amongst others. He has performed with the Philharmonia Orchestra, Los Angeles Philharmonic Orchestra and the Scottish Chamber Orchestra as well as appearances in London Proms where he has played both the Grieg Piano Concerto and the György Ligeti Piano Concerto.

Pöntinen's solo record debut was a recital of Russian piano music on the BIS Records label in 1984. He has since made over 50 records as soloist, accompanist and with orchestra.

Selected list of compositions 
The following list is based on information from the composer's web site.
 The Girl from Brazil (1981)
 Camera per trombone e pianoforte (1981) also version for jazz-group
 Blue Winter for trombone and strings (1987)
A performance of this piece on February 3, 1998, given by the Philadelphia Orchestra in Carnegie Hall, New York, was reviewed by Bernard Holland in the New York Times:
"A newer piece was Roland Pontinen's Blue Winter for trombone and orchestra. Mr. Pontinen takes an unlikely solo instrument deadly seriously as an agent for rich, flexible lyrical writing. Blue Winter is a kind of elegy in one movement. The trombone part, played here with skill and sincerity by Nitzan Haroz, is made to sing against slow-moving chordal sheets of string sound. The effect is both icy and mournful; the acid harmonies keep sentimentality at bay."
 Tango Plus for clarinet, violin, cello and piano (1993)
 Capriccio for two flutes and strings (1993)
 Mercury Dream for clarinet and piano (1994)
 Concerto for piano and winds (1994)
 Aiming at the ocean (1997)
 Sombre seascapes glowing (1997)

Notes

Sources 
 Official web site. Accessed 21 August 2009.
 Biography at bach-cantatas.com. Accessed 21 August 2009. 

1963 births
Living people
Musicians from Stockholm
Swedish pianists
Litteris et Artibus recipients
21st-century pianists
People of Ingrian Finnish descent
Swedish people of Finnish descent